Floyd J. McCree (1923–1988), was a Michigan politician.  He was the first African American mayor of Flint, Michigan.

Early life
Floyd Joel Mcree was born in Webster Grove, Missouri, on March 29, 1923, the son of Jordan Daniel McCree, Sr. and Minnie Blackwell.  He went to high school in St. Louis and attended Lincoln University, Jefferson City.

McCree served in the South Pacific in World War II in the army, rising to the rank of staff sergeant.  After leaving the service, he was hired in at the Buick foundry in Flint, becoming a foreman.  McCree was later promoted to supervisor of maintenance.

Political life
McCree was elected to the Flint City Commission in 1958.  The Flint City Commission selected him as mayor for the years 1966–68.  During his time as Mayor, he pushed for open housing and employment equal opportunity.

In 1967, he was involved in trying to end the violence in Detroit during the 1967 riots. That same year after the City Commission refused to adopt an open housing ordinance, he threatened to resign as mayor. Other prominent African-Americans joined in threatening to resign from public boards. The open housing law was later adopted in a charged contested referendum. McCree continued serving on the City Commission until 1970.  In 1970, he was a Michigan state representatives candidate for the 82nd district.

In 1971, McCree took office as Genesee County Register of deeds. He ran for Mayor under a new charter that directly elected a strong mayor in 1975 and 1979 losing both times to James W. Rutherford.

McCree continued to be elected County Register, but he died on June 15, 1988 before the primary election.

Legacy
On April 4, 2022, a bronze statue of McCree was unveiled in front of the Flint City Hall. The statue was made by artist Joe Rundell. The statue was financed by a fundraising campaign by the Community Foundation of Greater Flint.

References

African-American mayors in Michigan
Mayors of Flint, Michigan
People from Webster Groves, Missouri
1988 deaths
1923 births
20th-century African-American politicians
20th-century American politicians
United States Army personnel of World War II